The Emergency Management Act is an Act of the Canadian government. It was passed in June 2007 during the minority Harper government. It came into force in August 2007, and it revoked the Emergency Preparedness Act in so doing. It named the Minister of Public Safety and Emergency Preparedness as its enforcer, who is responsible under the Act for many things, including conducting exercises and providing education and training related to emergency management.

Furthermore, each Minister of the Crown is responsible under Section 6 of the Act:

Emergency Management Plans of Natural Resources Canada 
An audit process, which complies with the Internal Auditing Standards of the Government of Canada, of Natural Resources Canada's responsibilities under the Act discovers nine Emergency Management Plans (EMPs):
 Wildland Fires;
 Geological Hazards;
 Space Weather;
 Geomatics Support;
 Nuclear Explosions Monitoring;
 Nuclear and Radiological Incidents;
 Energy Supply Disruption;
 Offshore/onshore Oil and Gas Incidents; and
 Non-fuel Mineral and Metal Commodities and Production Shortages Support.

References

Emergency management in Canada
2007 establishments in Canada